Delta is a city in Keokuk County, Iowa, United States. The population was 264 at the 2020 census.

Geography
Delta is located at  (41.324112, -92.329481).

Demographics

2010 census
As of the census of 2010, there were 328 people, 157 households, and 78 families living in the city. The racial makeup of the city was 97.0% White, 1.8% African American, 0.3% Native American, 0.3% from other races, and 0.6% from two or more races. Hispanic or Latino of any race were 0.6% of the population.

There were 157 households, of which 27.4% had children under the age of 18 living with them, 36.3% were married couples living together, 9.6% had a female householder with no husband present, 3.8% had a male householder with no wife present, and 50.3% were non-families. 45.2% of all households were made up of individuals, and 18.5% had someone living alone who was 65 years of age or older. The average household size was 2.09 and the average family size was 2.91.

The median age in the city was 38.9 years. 22.9% of residents were under the age of 18; 5.8% were between the ages of 18 and 24; 28% were from 25 to 44; 25.9% were from 45 to 64; and 17.4% were 65 years of age or older. The gender makeup of the city was 48.8% male and 51.2% female.

2000 census
As of the census of 2000, there were 410 people, 172 households, and 99 families living in the city. The racial makeup of the city was 98.29% White, 1.22% from other races, and 0.49% from two or more races. Hispanic or Latino of any race were 1.71% of the population.

There were 172 households, out of which 26.2% had children under the age of 18 living with them, 43.6% were married couples living together, 7.6% had a female householder with no husband present, and 42.4% were non-families. 35.5% of all households were made up of individuals, and 19.8% had someone living alone who was 65 years of age or older. The average household size was 2.38 and the average family size was 3.09.

In the city, the population was spread out, with 26.8% under the age of 18, 8.5% from 18 to 24, 26.1% from 25 to 44, 19.3% from 45 to 64, and 19.3% who were 65 years of age or older. The median age was 37 years. For every 100 females, there were 83.0 males. For every 100 females age 18 and over, there were 88.7 males.

The median income for a household in the city was $27,019, and the median income for a family was $30,417. Males had a median income of $27,500 versus $18,333 for females. The per capita income for the city was $14,516. About 20.0% of families and 25.4% of the population were below the poverty line, including 33.6% of those under age 18 and 22.4% of those age 65 or over.

Education
The community is within the Sigourney Community School District.

References

Cities in Iowa
Cities in Keokuk County, Iowa